The 2011 Men's Junior World Handball Championship was the 18th edition of the tournament and was held at Thessaloniki, Greece from July 17–31, 2011.

Oceania withdrew their participation at this year's tournament, Norway replaced the Oceanian team.

Uruguay withdrew from this year's edition, Venezuela replaced them as the first substitute of the Pan-American continent.

In a rematch of the 2009 final Germany defeated Denmark 27–18 in the final.

Format
The 24 teams were allocated into six groups with the first four advancing to the eighthfinals in a knock-out system until the final.

Preliminary round
The draw took place at April 16, 2011 at 12:00 local time in Thessaloniki, Greece. The schedule was announced on June 21.

Group A

All times are local (UTC+3).

Group B

All times are local (UTC+3).

Group C

All times are local (UTC+3).

Group D

All times are local (UTC+3).

Knockout stage

Championship

Eightfinals

Quarterfinals

Semifinals

Third place game

Final

5–8th place play-offs

Semifinals

Seventh place game

Fifth place game

9th–16th place playoffs

13–16th place bracket

Quarterfinals

13th–16th place Semifinals

9th–12th place Semifinals

Fifteenth place game

Thirteenth place game

Eleventh place game

Ninth place game

17–20th place play-offs

Semifinals

Nineteenth place game

Seventeenth place game

21–24th place play-offs

Semifinals

21st place game

23rd place game

Final standings

All-star team
Goalkeeper: 
Left wing: 
Left back: 
Pivot: 
Centre back: 
Right back: 
Right wing:

References

Daily reports
Match day 1 - Serbia, Slovenia, Germany and Russia take their first victories at the Men's Junior WCh

External links

IHF Site

2011 in handball
Men's Junior World Handball Championship
2011 Men's Junior World Handball Championship
World Handball Championship youth and junior tournaments